Frances Tekyi-Mensah (born 1986) is a beauty queen who represented Ghana in Miss World 2008 in South Africa.  She has a bachelor's degree in Psychology and is a Chartered Accountant, working in London.

References

1986 births
Living people
Miss World 2008 delegates
Ghanaian beauty pageant winners
People from Elmina